Men's 10 metre air rifle was one of the thirteen shooting events at the 1988 Summer Olympics. It was the first Olympic three positions competition to feature final shooting.

Qualification round

DNS Did not start – OR Olympic record – Q Qualified for final

Final

OR Olympic record

References

Sources

Shooting at the 1988 Summer Olympics
Men's events at the 1988 Summer Olympics